The pygmy hog (Porcula salvania) is the rarest species of pig in the world today, and is the only species in the genus Porcula. It is also the smallest species of pig in the world, with its piglets being small enough to fit in one's pocket. Populations of pygmy hogs were once widespread in the tall, dense, wet grasslands in a narrow belt of the southern Himalayan foothills from north-western Uttar Pradesh to Assam, through southern Nepal and North Bengal, and possibly extending into contiguous habitats in southern Bhutan. Due to human encroachment and destruction of the pygmy hogs’ natural habitat, the species was thought to have gone extinct in the early 1960’s. However, in 1971, a small pygmy hog population was rediscovered as they were fleeing a fire near the Barnadi Wildlife Sanctuary in Assam. Today, the only known population of pygmy hogs resides in Manas National Park in Assam, India. The population is threatened by livestock grazing, fires and poaching. With an estimated population of less than 250 mature individuals, the pygmy hog is listed as an Endangered species on the IUCN Red List, and conservation efforts such as captive breeding and re-release programs are currently being employed.

Taxonomy

Porcula salvania was the scientific name proposed by Brian Houghton Hodgson in 1847 who described a pygmy hog from the Sikkim Terai. Hodgson argued that the pygmy hog was a genus separate from Sus based upon its unique morphological differences, particularly pertaining to its skull and dental features. Hodgson’s classification of the pygmy hog as a separate genus was challenged with the argument that the pygmy hog’s unique physical characteristics were “superficial” and merely a result of its small body size, therefore deeming these features insufficient to warrant separate distinction from other members of the genus Sus. Its species epithet salvania is after the sal forests where the pygmy hog was found.
Although the decision was not unanimous, the pygmy hog was later determined to be a member of the pig species in the genus Sus and was renamed Sus salvanius.

A 2007 genetic analysis of the variation in three mitochondrial DNA loci, combined with rigorous statistical testing of other phylogenetic hypotheses, confirmed Hodgson's original classification that the pygmy hog is, indeed, a separate and distinct genus from Sus. The analysis also showed that the pygmy hog had never clustered together with Sus scrofa or with any other Sus species. Based upon this genetic analysis and resulting evidence, the pygmy hog has again been re-classified as its own unique genus Porcula, which is a sister lineage to Sus. The resurrection of the original genus status and the species name Porcula salvania has been adopted by GenBank and has been included as an update in the 3rd edition of the Wilson and Reeder's Mammal Species of the World.

Characteristics

The skin of the pygmy hog is a grayish-brown color, and its coat consists of blackish-brown bristles. Its irises are hazel brown, and it usually has no facial warts. Its head is sharply tapered with a slight crest of hair on the forehead and on the back of the neck. It has well-developed teeth, with upturned canines and molars with rounded cusps. Adult males have the upper canines visible on the sides of their mouths.

As suggested by its name, the pygmy hog differs from other members of the Suidae by the extreme reduction of its body size, and it is the smallest pig species.

Distribution and habitat
The pygmy hog is endemic to northeast India and was once widespread in the tall, wet grasslands of the Terai from Uttar Pradesh through Nepal to Bangladesh, northern West Bengal and Assam. The species was dependent on early successional riverine communities which were tall, dense grasslands, commonly referred to as ‘thatchland’. In its most pristine state, this ‘thatchland’ was intermixed with a wide variety of herbaceous plants and early colonizing shrubs and young trees. Although many species of tall grasses dominated these various areas, the most important to the pygmy hog communities were areas which dominated by Saccharum munja, S. spontaneum, S. bengalenis, Themeda villosa, Narenga porphyrocoma, and Imperata cylindrical. Growing up to 1 to 4 m in height, these grass species were maintained by periodic burning, which posed a great threat to the pygmy hog communities. Since these grass species were also commercially important thatching grasses, they were harvested annually, thereby also causing great disruption to the pygmy hog habitat. 

The pygmy hog is currently on the verge of extinction. By 2002, the only viable population, consisting of only a few hundred individuals, currently exists in small grassland pockets of Manas National Park in Assam, India, and an adjacent reserve forest in the Manas Tiger Reserve, and nowhere else in the world. Today, it is estimated that only about 250 pygmy hogs still remain in existence.

Behavior and ecology 
Pygmy hogs are social animals that live in small family groups consisting of one or two females and their offspring. They are non-territorial, and sometimes family groups can consist of as many as 20 individuals. Adult males are generally solitary and live separately rather than with the family group. However, they do maintain loose contact with the basic family group throughout the year.

Pygmy hogs also have a very unique nesting behavior which the tall grasses of their habitat enable them to perform. In the wild, they make firm nests in which to sleep by digging small trenches, using dry grasses and vegetation to line them. They sleep in these nests at night, but also retreat to these nests during the heat of the day, and use them to warm up in the winter. The nests are also used for birthing and to hide and protect newborn piglets.

Piglets are born greyish-pink in color, and develop a brown coat with faint yellow stripes along their body length before they attain their final adult coloring. Their average lifespan is between 8 and 14 years in the wild, and they become sexually mature at one or two years old. Breeding occurs seasonally before the monsoons, and after a gestation period of 100 days, females give birth to litters ranging between two to six offspring, with the average litter size being three to four piglets.

Pygmy hogs are diurnal and forage for food during the daylight hours. Foraging usually takes place for about 6 to 10 hours a day, with the pygmy hog generally taking a break midday in order to escape the high heat of the afternoon. Pygmy hogs are also omnivorous and feed primarily on roots, tubers, and other vegetative food, as well as on insects, rodents, eggs, young birds, and small reptiles.

Pygmy hogs also fulfill important ecological roles within their ecosystems, since by using their snouts to dig for food, they not only spread seeds from plants, but they also enhance the quality of the soil. They sometimes fall prey to pythons, raptors and other carnivores.

Threats 
The pygmy hog is considered to be one of the most threatened mammalian species today, and has been listed as “critically endangered” by the International Union of Conservation (IUCN) since 2008. Unfortunately, humans have posed one of the greatest threats to pygmy hogs, as they have severely and negatively impacted the pygmy hogs’ natural habitat. Since pygmy hogs live among some of the most important ‘thatching grasses’, their native environments are being destroyed by humans for commercial purposes. Most of these grasses are harvested annually (even those in areas which are supposedly protected), and most of them are subjected to wide-scale annual or twice-annual burning as a means of maintenance. Although ecologists have suggested burning at the beginning of the dry season in December or early January, and only once every 2-3 years, most of the grasslands continue to be burnt annually during the dry season, thereby drastically affecting the flora and faunal diversity of the area.

As the survival of the pygmy hog is dependent on these tall grasses, the pygmy hog has been driven further into the corner as many of the tall grasses are continuously being harvested and burned, and others are being replaced by short grass species. In Assam, much of the pygmy hog's habitat has also been lost to settlements and agriculture due to rapid human population growth. Loss and degradation of habitat has also occurred due to livestock grazing, commercial forestry and the planting of trees in the grasslands, and due to flood control schemes. In addition, although hunting the pygmy hog for meat by the native tribes of Assam had previously not been a problem, it is now posing a very real threat to the small population of pygmy hogs that still exist in the wild.

Conservation
The pygmy hog is protected under Schedule I of India's Wild Life (Protection) Act, 1972, providing absolute protection with the highest penalties for offenders. The pygmy hog is also listed in CITES Appendix I, which includes all species of plants and animals threatened with extinction.

The Pygmy Hog Conservation Breeding Programme (PHCP) was formed in 1995 in order to aid the implementation of a broad conservation action for not only this critically endangered species, but for its endangered habitat as well. In an effort to increase the small numbers of pygmy hogs, one of the Programme’s main objectives was to implement a captive breeding and reintroduction program in order to protect against possible early extinction of the species. Two males and four female pygmy hogs were caught under permit in Manas National Park and transferred to a facility in Basistha, India, where they became the founders of the current captive-breeding program. After two years, the breeding program was so successful that the pygmy hog population had increased by over 600%, and an additional breeding facility was established at Potasali in Nameri in order to house the increasing population. Realizing that the pygmy hogs cannot be released directly from the breeding facility back into the wild, the PHCP utilizes a “soft release” method in order to pre-condition the animals to survive in the wild. The pre-conditioning process takes about five months, and occurs in a specially constructed ‘pre-release’ facility in Potasali. While here, the pygmy hogs are divided into social groups, and live in environments simulated to resemble their natural habitat where they can engage in natural foraging, nest-building, and other natural behaviors. Just prior to their release, the pygmy hogs are taken to a reintroduction site where they are maintained for two to three days to ensure their readiness before they are officially released back into the wild.  Between 2008 and 2016, one hundred captive-bred pygmy hogs have been successfully reintroduced into the wild at three different locations in Assam, these being Sonai Rupai, Orang, and Barnadi. Meanwhile, a further 60 remain in captivity as a safety net population in order to continue to produce new pygmy hogs for future releases. In addition to their captive breeding program, the PHCP is also working to restore and maintain the natural habitat of the pygmy hogs. As the survival of the pygmy hog is dependent on grassland habitats, the PHCP is working closely with forest department officials in Assam to ensure that these grasslands are maintained so that the pygmy hog can be saved.

See also
Pygmy hog-sucking louse

References

External links

Pygmy Hog Conservation Programme
Entry on "Pygmy Hog – Sus salvanius"; United Nations Environment Programme; World Conservation Monitoring Centre
ARKive – images and movies of the pygmy hog (Sus salvanius)
GeneBank – Porcula salvania

Mammals described in 1847
Taxa named by Brian Houghton Hodgson
Mammals of Bhutan
Mammals of India
Suidae